Glover is a 1998 platform video game developed by Interactive Studios and published by Hasbro Interactive for the Nintendo 64 and Windows in 1998, and for the PlayStation in 1999 (branded under Hasbro Interactive's Atari Interactive label). The game follows a magical, four-fingered glove named Glover in his quest to restore the Crystal Kingdom by retrieving crystals that were lost. The Nintendo 64 and Windows versions received generally positive reviews while the PlayStation version garnered negative reviews. A sequel titled Glover 2 was planned but was eventually cancelled. A second updated Windows port was released in 2022, and later in 2022, a port was announced for modern consoles as well.

Gameplay 

Players control a glove named Glover. The main objective is to maneuver the ball toward the goal in each stage. Once all three stages and the boss stage are cleared, a crystal ball can be restored back to the castle. There are a total of six worlds, each containing three stages, a boss stage and a bonus stage which can be accessed by collecting all the magic cards known as "Garibs" in a given world. When Glover is in contact with the ball, he can roll, bounce, throw, slap, dribble, walk on top of the ball, and use the ball as a trampoline. Without the ball, Glover can do both regular and double jumps, cartwheel, fist slam, locate the ball and garibs, and grab the ball. While walking on the ball, the controls are reversed. On the easy difficulty, walking on the ball is automatic while moving the ball across water. However, bonus stages are unavailable.

The ball can also be magically transformed into one of four main ball forms: rubber ball, ballbearing, bowling ball, and the ball's original crystal form. With a cheat code, the ball can be transformed into a power (high-bounce or super) ball. The rubber form gives the greatest amount of abilities for the ball. It can easily be bounced, slapped, thrown, and even float on water. The bowling ball form allows the ball to not break easily, sink in deep water, and kill enemies by slapping it. The ballbearing form gives precise control over the ball, can be used to throw and slap the ball more carefully and is also magnetic. The crystal form floats on water and is very fragile, but gives Glover double points for each obtained Garib. The power ball can be used to bounce to higher places, and Glover can slap and throw it farther than in any other forms. Throughout the stages, there are also plenty of magic potions that help Glover by giving him power-ups for a certain amount of time.

If the ball gets destroyed or Glover loses all three hearts, Glover loses one life and must start from the beginning of the stage or from the last checkpoint.

Plot
The story takes place in a fictional land known as the Crystal Kingdom, where a wizard rules from his Crystal Castle, which is surrounded by six portals leading into other worlds, including the lost city of Atlantis, a circus park, a pirate's domain, a prehistoric era, a horror-themed fortress and outer space. The life force of the kingdom is maintained by seven magical crystals that rest atop the spires of Crystal Castle. The wizard himself is accompanied by a pair of magical, sentient gloves named Glover and Glovel, who assist him in creating strange potions and spells.

Then one day, the wizard accidentally mixes the wrong batch of potions in his cauldron, causing a large explosion that turns wizard into a statue and sends his gloves flying. The left glove, Glovel, lands in the cauldron while the right glove, Glover, flies out the window and lands onto the ground outside the castle. The explosion also shakes the crystals from the spires, causing the land to become dark and foreboding. Before they could shatter upon impact, Glover quickly casts magic to turn the crystals into rubber balls. One of the balls remains in the kingdom while the other six bounce into each of the portals. Glover realizes that in order to bring the wizard back to life and restore the kingdom's beauty, he must enter these worlds, find the crystals within them and bring them back to the castle. However, Glovel had been corrupted by the cauldron's chemicals and becomes "Cross-Stitch", a malevolent trickster who is determined to destroy Glover and rule the Crystal Kingdom for himself.

Glover traverses from realm to realm and must protect the rubber balls at all costs while bring them back home. As he does, Cross-Stitch attempts to thwart him by setting traps and creating monsters, but Glover is able to overcome these obstacles with his magical skills and retrieve the crystals. He is also aided by a living hat named Mr. Tip, who offers hints during Glover's quest. The Crystal Kingdom is gradually restored to its former state with each crystal returned to the castle. In the final realm, Glover fights Cross-Stitch in a giant robot fight and emerges victorious, sending Cross-Stitch flying.

After the last crystal is brought back, they all return to the castle spires where they belong. Thus, the wizard is finally returned to flesh and the kingdom is fully restored to normal. As he and Glover take in the sights, Cross-Stitch lands right in front of them. Glover then jumps back onto his master's hand and beckons Cross-Stitch to do so as well. Cross-Stitch attempts to run away, but the wizard casts a spell that turns him back into Glovel. He then puts Glovel back on and all three of them celebrate with a double thumbs up.

Development
Glover was developed by Interactive Studios and published by Hasbro Interactive. The game was originally announced at E3 1998, later it was reported that the game was 60% completed in August 1998. Two months later in October, the game was reported to be 70% completed. During late in development, it was reported that Glover would have required the character to cross water.

Reception 

For the Nintendo 64 version, Glover received generally positive reviews by critics. Matt Casamassina of IGN praised the Nintendo 64 version, specifically on its gameplay and sound. They wrote that the music matched the levels "perfectly". John Broady of GameSpot recommended the game for patient players in search of a challenge. Paul Hales of PC Zone gave it a 67% stating, "It's all good, clean, harmless fun in reasonably 3D rendered landscapes." Edge magazine gave the game a 7 out of 10 stating it wasn't all that original but also stated that the game provides regular surprises that make it an entertaining game.

Next Generation reviewed the Nintendo 64 version of the game, rating it three stars out of five, and stated that "with interesting level designs, a challenging structure for item collection, and bright, competent visuals, Glover does manage to provide a refreshing angle on typical platformers."

Despite positive reviews for the Nintendo 64 version, the PlayStation version was heavily panned by critics. Matt Whine of IGN gave the PlayStation version a "Terrible" 2.6. They wrote that the game "looks bad" in comparison with both the Nintendo 64 version and other PlayStation games. Miguel Lopez of GameSpot also criticized this version, stating that "Glover, despite its interesting play mechanics, seems to have lost its soul in the port from the N64." PC Zone gave the game 56% stating, "There's no denying Glover is bizarre, but at the same its not particularly interesting. The standard trudge through obligatory ice world, water world and space world, flicking switches as you go, hardly constitutes as enthralling gameplay."

Cancelled sequel 

In July 1999, Interactive Studios announced a sequel titled Glover 2 was being developed after the first one was released. The game was set to continue where the story of the first game left off and would have a more complete story that would unravel as the game progressed. Gameplay features of Glover 2 would have been similar to the original game with enhancements for hand/ball physics, enhanced graphics, and a new multiplayer mode. The game was expected to release in mid-1999 for the Nintendo 64, then PlayStation and Dreamcast the following year, but it ended up getting cancelled along with another N64 game from Interactive Studios, Frogger 2. In October 2011 it was reported that Nesworld.com acquired a prototype cartridge of the game and had released a ROM hack and a video of the game. On February 25, 2015, James Steele, a programmer formerly of Interactive Studios, released a blog entry detailing the reasoning of the cancellation of the game. Publisher Hasbro had planned on acquiring 150,000 units of N64 cartridges for the game. At the time, Nintendo had a special deal that would give a discount when purchasing more cartridges. An employee of Hasbro in charge of ordering the cartridges bumped the amount to 300,000 units. Hasbro was left with approximately 150,000 units as retailers didn't want any additional stock, costing Hasbro roughly half-a-million dollars' worth of stock that could not be sold. Hasbro was forced to take a loss on all of the extra cartridges it ordered and decided to cancel the project due to its financial situation along with the bad reputation the situation had caused. The game was around 80-85% completed before development ceased.

In 2018, indie studio Golden Mushroom claimed that it would be working on a sequel to Glover for Nintendo Switch. In reality, the studio applied for the trademark for Glover but not the copyright for Glover leading the studio to mistakenly believe that they also had ownership rights to the character and content of the original Glover game; those rights were purchased from Piko Interactive, who had purchased the copyright from Glover from Atari SA, which had purchased Hasbro Interactive in 2001.

Re-releases 
In 2017, Piko Interactive, a game company focused on re-releasing old video games, physically acquired several properties from Atari SA including Glover. The company stated their intent to produce a re-release of Glover for newer platforms such as Steam, as well as finish and release the Nintendo 64 version of Glover 2. On March 7, 2022, Piko announced a remaster of Glover for modern computers built using the game's original source code. It was released via GOG.com and Steam on April 20, 2022, and will eventually be released on the upcoming Bleem! Store. On October 26, 2022, during the QUByte Connect 2022 presentation, a port of Glover was announced by QUByte Interactive for the Nintendo Switch, PlayStation 4, PlayStation 5, Xbox One, and Xbox Series X/S.

Notes

References

External links 
 
 Glover 2 prototype information at NESWorld.com
 Glover 2 at Unseen64

1998 video games
3D platform games
Blitz Games Studios games
Nintendo 64 games
Piko Interactive games
PlayStation (console) games
Single-player video games
Video games developed in the United Kingdom
Windows games